This is a list of rivers of Guadeloupe. Rivers are listed in clockwise order, starting at the Rivière Salèe which divides Basse-Terre from Grand-Terre.

Basse-Terre
Rivière Salèe (Ocean channel)
Lézarde
Rivière Moustique
Rose Rivière
La Petite Rivière à Goyaves
Rivière de Sainte-Marie

Rivière du Grand Carbet
Rivière du Petit Carbet
Rivière de Bananier
Rivière Bourceau
Rivière Saint-Sauveur

Le Galion Rivière
Rivière aux Herbes
Rivière des Pères 

Rivière du Plessis
Grande Rivière des Vieux-Habitants

Rivière Grande Plaine
Rivière Petite Plaine
Rivière Madame
Rivière Moustique (Rivière Moustique à Sainte-Rose)

Rivière Bras David
Rivière Corossol
Rivière du Lamentin

Grande-Terre
Rivière Salèe (Ocean channel)
Canal Perrin
Canal des Rotours
Rivière des Coudes (Ravine Coudes)

Marie-Galante
Rivière de Saint-Louis à Marie-Galante
Rivière du Vieux-Fort

References
Taxonomical and ecological studies on epilithic diatom communities of watercourses from Guadeloupe
 GEOnet Names Server

 
Rivers
G